Jadallah Azzuz at-Talhi (born 1939) is a Libyan diplomat and politician who served as prime minister of Libya for two terms.

Education
Born in 1939, Talhi obtained a geology degree from Louvain University.

Career
Talhi was previously working in the Ministry of Mines when he was named the Minister of Industry and Mineral Resources in July 1972. Talhi held this position until March 1977.

General Secretary
Talhi was General Secretary of the People's Committee in Libya (Prime Minister) for two terms, the first term from 2 March 1979 to 16 February 1984 and the second term from September 1986 to 1 March 1987. In March 1987 Umar Mustafa al-Muntasir succeeded him as prime minister.

Foreign Minister
Talhi served as foreign minister of Libya in the late 1980s, replacing Kamel Maghur as foreign minister. 
In September 1987, Talhi visited Baghdad to reestablish foreign relations and participated in the creation of the Arab Maghreb Union.  Talhi's tenure lasted until 1990.

Chemical Weapons

Paris Conference
Talhi met with U.S. Secretary of State George P. Shultz at the Paris Conference in January 1989 at UNESCO's headquarters. Talhi denied the accusation by the United States that Libya was creating chemical weapons in Rabta. In response, Talhi accused the United States of allegedly knowing the location of chemical weapons in the Middle East. Specifically, Talhi highlighted that there was an international relationship between Israel and the United States in regards to the development of nuclear weapons.

Lockerbie bombing
In January 1992, Talhi condemned the surrendering of the Libyans accused of the Lockerbie bombing.

References

1939 births
Living people
Prime Ministers of Libya
Foreign ministers of Libya
Government ministers of Libya
Permanent Representatives of Libya to the United Nations
Members of the General People's Committee of Libya